The Roman Catholic Diocese of Maralal is a diocese located in the city of Maralal in the Ecclesiastical province of Nyeri in Kenya.

History
 15 June 2001: Established as Diocese of Maralal from Diocese of Marsabit

Leadership
Bishops of Maralal
 Virgilio Pante, I.M.C. (15 June 2001 – 20 July 2022)
 Hieronymus Joya, I.M.C. (20 July 2020 – present)
 bishop elect

See also
Roman Catholicism in Kenya

References

Sources
 GCatholic.org
 Catholic Hierarchy

Roman Catholic dioceses in Kenya
Christian organizations established in 2001
Roman Catholic dioceses and prelatures established in the 21st century
2001 establishments in Kenya
Roman Catholic Ecclesiastical Province of Nyeri